Macromia flinti is a species of dragonfly in the family Macromiidae. It is endemic to Sri Lanka.  Its natural habitats are subtropical or tropical moist lowland forests and rivers. It is threatened by habitat loss.

References

Dragonflies of Sri Lanka
Macromiidae
Insects described in 1977
Taxonomy articles created by Polbot